The 2019–20 season is Pegasus's 12th season in the top-tier division in Hong Kong football. Pegasus will compete in the Premier League, Senior Challenge Shield, FA Cup and Sapling Cup this season. However, due to the 2020 coronavirus pandemic in Hong Kong, Pegasus announced their withdrawal from the remaining matches this season in April 2020.

Squad

First Team
As of 21 March 2020

 FP

 FP

 FP

 FP (on loan from Eastern)

 FP

Remarks:
LP These players are registered as local players in Hong Kong domestic football competitions.
FP These players are registered as foreign players.

Transfers

Transfers in

Transfers out

Loans In

Loans Out

Team staff

Competitions

Hong Kong Premier League

Table

Hong Kong Senior Challenge Shield

Hong Kong Sapling Cup

Group stage

Hong Kong FA Cup

Remarks

References

Hong Kong football clubs 2019–20 season